Dwayne Collins (born April 13, 1988) is an American former professional basketball player. A power forward, Collins played college basketball for the University of Miami before being selected with the final pick in the 2010 NBA draft by the Phoenix Suns.

College statistics 

|-
| align="left" | 2006–07
| align="left" | Miami
| 32 || 22 || 25.2 || .538 || .000 || .579 || 6.5 || .6 || .6 || .6 || 8.6
|-
| align="left" | 2007–08
| align="left" | Miami
| 34 || 18 || 20.0 || .550 || .000 || .500 || 6.5 || .4 || .5 || .9 || 8.6
|-
| align="left" | 2008–09
| align="left" | Miami
| 31 || 31 || 24.9 || .565 || .000 || .583 || 7.3 || 1.3 || 1.0 || .4 || 10.6
|-
| align="left" | 2009–10
| align="left" | Miami
| 29 || 28 || 24.7 || .604 || .000 || .569 || 7.8 || 1.2 || .6 || 1.1 || 12.0
|-
| style="text-align:center;" colspan="2"|Career
| 126 || 99 || 23.6 || .565 || .000 || .563 || 7.0 || .9 || .7 || .7 || 9.9

Professional career 
Collins was drafted 60th overall by the Phoenix Suns in the 2010 NBA draft. He signed with Italian team Cimberio Varese for the 2010–11 season, but he was let go prior to the start of the season after sustaining a knee injury.

Due to the knee injury, Collins' next stint came in July 2013 when he joined the Suns for the 2013 NBA Summer League. In five games for the Suns, he averaged 1.2 points in 5.3 minutes per game.

References

External links
NBADraft.net profile

1988 births
Living people
Basketball players from Miami
Miami Hurricanes men's basketball players
Phoenix Suns draft picks
Power forwards (basketball)
American men's basketball players